Kobe Bufkin (born September 21, 2003) is an American college basketball player for the Michigan Wolverines of the Big Ten Conference.

High school career
Bufkin played basketball for Grand Rapids Christian High School in Grand Rapids, Michigan. He joined the varsity team as a freshman. As a sophomore, Bufkin averaged 20 points, seven rebounds and three assists per game, helping his team achieve a 16–6 record. In his junior season, he averaged 22 points, five rebounds and four assists per game, leading his team to a 20–2 record. As a senior, he averaged 25 points, seven rebounds and five assists per game in five games, before missing most of the season with a fractured left wrist. Bufkin was named to the McDonald's All-American Game and Jordan Brand Classic rosters.

Recruiting
A consensus four-star recruit, Bufkin committed to playing college basketball for Michigan over offers from LSU, DePaul, Michigan State and Ohio State. He was drawn to Michigan by assistant coach Saddi Washington. Along with Caleb Houstan, Moussa Diabaté, he was part of a recruiting class was that the top-ranked class in the nation for the 2021–22 Michigan Wolverines.

College career
As a freshman, Bufkin averaged three points and 1.1 rebounds per game in 10.6 minutes per game. On December 20, 2021, he earned co-Big Ten freshman of the week honors for his first double digit scoring effort on December 18 against Southern Utah.

He picked up a lot of minutes as a sophomore following the 2022 departures of Eli Brooks, DeVante' Jones and Frankie Collins. He posted a then-career-high 22 points in back-to-back games against Lipscomb (December 17) and North Carolina in the Jumpman Invitational (December 21). On February 2, 2023, Bufkin contributed 15 points and a career-high 12 rebounds, for his first career double-double as well as a career-high eight assists against Northwestern. On February 26, Bufkin led Michigan with a career-high 28 points in an 87–79 overtime victory over Wisconsin.  Following the regular season, he earned All-Big Ten 3rd team recognition from the media and honorable mention recognition from the coaches.

Career statistics

College

|-
| style="text-align:left;"| 2021–22
| style="text-align:left;"| Michigan
| 28 || 0 || 10.6 || .380 || .222 || .773 || 1.1 || .3 || .4 || .1 || 3.0

References

External links
Michigan Wolverines bio

2003 births
Living people
American men's basketball players
Basketball players from Grand Rapids, Michigan
McDonald's High School All-Americans
Michigan Wolverines men's basketball players
Shooting guards